Kshama is a Sanskrit word that relates to the acts of patience, releasing time and functioning in the now. Macdonell defines it as: "patience, forbearance, indulgence (towards...)". Kshama also indicates extreme patience and a capacity to forgive and forget.

The concept of Kshama forms one of the Ten Traditional Yamas, or restraints, that are codified in numerous scriptures including the Shandilya and Varaha Upanishads and the Hatha Yoga Pradipika by Gorakshanatha.

It is sometimes used as a female given name.

People with the given name
Kshama Metre (born 1950), Indian rural development leader and pediatrician
Kshama Sawant (born 1973), Indian-American politician

See also
 Forgiveness (Hinduism)
 Shama (Equanimity)
 Dama (Temperance)
 Dhyana (Serenity)
 Ānanda (Happiness)
 Titiksha (Forbearance)

References

Sanskrit words and phrases
Hindu philosophical concepts
Indian feminine given names